This is a list of the bays of Samoa:

 Apia Bay
 Asau Bay
 Fagalele Bay
 Fagaloa Bay
 Lefaga Bay
 Matautu Bay
 Paluali Bay
 Papalaulelei Bay
 Salailua Bay
 Sataua Bay
 Siumu Bay
 Uafato Bay
 Vailele Bay
 Vaisala Bay
 Vaiusu Bay

References

Bodies of water of Samoa